St. Paul's Convent English Higher Secondary School is a private Christian school run by the CMC Sisters of Nirmala Province, located in Kuriachira, Thrissur. Founded in 1964 with less than 100 students, the school has since grown into a higher secondary school with more than 2,800 on its roll.

The Ministry of Electronics and Information Technology Rajeev Chandrasekhar have studied in this school for an year during his childhood.

References

High schools and secondary schools in Kerala
Christian schools in Kerala
Schools in Thrissur district
Educational institutions established in 1964
1964 establishments in Kerala